Brigadier-General Sir Eric Edward Boketon Holt-Wilson  (26 August 1875 – 26 March 1950) was a British Army officer who left the army to join the nascent British Security Service (MI5), which developed in time to deal with espionage during World War I. He became the Service's deputy to Sir Vernon Kell, serving through to the beginning of World War II.

Family life
Born in Norwich, Norfolk, in 1875, Holt-Wilson was the son of Reverend Thomas Holt-Wilson and his wife Helen Emily Greene, daughter of Edward Greene. He was educated at Harrow School from 1887 to 1892.

He was married twice, firstly to Susannah Mary Shaw in 1903 and secondly Audrey Stirling in 1931.

Military service
Holt-Wilson took a commission in the Royal Engineers and then attended the Royal Military Academy, Woolwich (1893-95). On being commissioned after his time at Woolwich he joined 7 Field Regiment, Royal Engineers and was posted to South Africa 1899–1902. On returning from overseas service he became an instructor at the School of Military Engineering, 1903–1906. This was followed by a tour of duty as Cadet Company Commander and Instructor in Military Engineering back at the Royal Military Academy at Woolwich, 1909–1912; this was his last military posting before joining the Imperial Security Intelligence Service.

His war service in South Africa was excellent and he was mentioned in despatches twice in 8 February and 10 September 1901. He received the Queen's South Africa Medal with five clasps and the King's South Africa Medal with two clasps; and was created a Companion of the Distinguished Service Order (DSO) on 27 September 1901: "In recognition of services during the operations in South Africa."

Intelligence service
Rising public fears in Great Britain of German espionage precipitated the creation of a new government intelligence agency formed by Vernon Kell in 1909. In 1912 Holt-Wilson went to work for Vernon Kell, then the Director of what was termed the Home Section of the Secret Service Bureau with responsibility for investigating espionage, sabotage and subversion in Britain.

Holt-Wilson served on the Imperial General Staff from 1914 to 1924. He remained a loyal and dedicated deputy to Kell and was sacked along with his director by Winston Churchill in 1940.

Honours
Holt-Wilson was awarded the following orders and decorations:
Was made a Knight Bachelor (Kt) in the 1933 Birthday Honours
Companion of the Order of St Michael and St George (CMG)
Distinguished Service Order
Legion of Honour
Officer of Order of the Crown of Belgium

See also
 Vernon Kell

References

Sources
Intelligence and Imperial Defence: British Intelligence and the Defence of the British Empire, by Richard James Popplewell, 1995

MI5 personnel
Royal Engineers officers
British Army personnel of the Second Boer War
Knights Bachelor
Companions of the Distinguished Service Order
Graduates of the Royal Military Academy, Woolwich
People educated at Harrow School
1875 births
1950 deaths
British Army brigadiers
British Army personnel of World War I
Military personnel from Norwich
Academics of the Royal Military Academy, Woolwich